National defense is a nation's use of military, economic and political power to maintain survival.

National defense or national defence may also refer to: 
 National Defense (Poland), a volunteer military formation of the Second Polish Republic
 National Defense (magazine), a business and technology magazine published by the National Defense Industrial Association
 National missile defense, a military strategy to shield a country from missiles
 Movement of National Defence, a Greek government during WWI

See also
 Ministry of defence, part of a government responsible for matters of defence
 National security (disambiguation)
 Defense (disambiguation)
 National Defence Academy (disambiguation)
 National Defence University (disambiguation)